The Feud Girl is a 1916 American drama silent film directed by Frederick A. Thomson and written by Charles Logue. The film stars Hazel Dawn, Irving Cummings, Arthur Morrison, Hardee Kirkland, Russell Simpson and Gertrude Norman. The film was released on May 14, 1916, by Paramount Pictures.

Plot

Cast 
Hazel Dawn as Nell Haddon, 'The Spitfire'
Irving Cummings as Dave Bassett / Dave Rand
Arthur Morrison as Luke Haddon
Hardee Kirkland as Judd Haddon
Russell Simpson as	Zeb Bassett
Gertrude Norman as Sue Bassett
George Majeroni as Marlowe
Edna Holland as Anne Marlowe

References

External links 
 

1916 films
1910s English-language films
Silent American drama films
1916 drama films
Paramount Pictures films
American black-and-white films
American silent feature films
Films directed by Frederick A. Thomson
1910s American films